The 1978 Toledo Rockets football team was an American football team that represented the University of Toledo in the Mid-American Conference (MAC) during the 1978 NCAA Division I-A football season. In their second season under head coach Chuck Stobart, the Rockets compiled a 2–9 record (2–7 against MAC opponents), finished in eighth place in the MAC, and were outscored by all opponents by a combined total of 256 to 144.

The team's statistical leaders included Maurice Hall with 610 passing yards, Mike Alston with 460 rushing yards, and Butch Hunyadi with 494 receiving yards.

Schedule

References

Toledo
Toledo Rockets football seasons
Toledo Rockets football